The FA Trophy 2008–09 was the fortieth season of the FA Trophy, the Football Association's cup competition for teams at levels 5–8 of the English football league system. The number of team entries for this season was 263.

Calendar

Preliminary round
· Ties will be played on 4 October 2008.

Ties

Replays

First round qualifying
Ties will be played on 18 October 2008.

Teams from Premier Division of Southern League, Northern Premier League and Isthmian League entered in this round.

Ties

Replays

Second round qualifying
Ties will be played on 1 November 2007

Ties

Replays

Third round qualifying
Ties will be played on 22 November 2007

Teams from Conference North and Conference South entered in this round.

Ties

Replays

First round
This round is the first in which Conference Premier teams join those from lower reaches of the National League System.

Ties will be played on 13 December 2008.

Ties

Replays

Second round
Ties will be played on 10 January 2009.

Ties

Replays

Third round
Ties will be played on 31 January 2009.

Ties

Replays

Fourth round
Ties will be played on 21 February 2009.

Ties

Replays

Semi-finals

First leg

Second leg

Final

References

General
 Football Club History Database: FA Trophy 2008-09

Specific

2008–09 domestic association football cups
League
2008-09